Four of Diamonds are an English girl group composed of Caroline Alvares, Lauren Rammell, Sophia Saffarian and Yasmin Broom. In 2016, they competed in the thirteenth series of The X Factor, where they finished in eighth place. In 2018, they were signed to EMI Records.

History

2016–2017: The X Factor

A week before their audition for The X Factor, the group chose their name in a rehearsal studio, inspired by a card game they were playing. They narrowed their options down to Four of Diamonds and Four of Hearts. They went with Four of Diamonds because of how popular diamonds are, as well as how strong the stones can be.

Four of Diamonds auditioned for The X Factor in the third set of room auditions, performing "No" by Meghan Trainor. They then progressed to bootcamp and the six-chair challenge, gaining a seat and making it through to judges' houses, mentored by Louis Walsh. They were eventually sent home by Walsh. However, on 10 October 2016, it was announced that Four of Diamonds would take Brooks Way's place for the remainder of the live shows, starting in week 2. In week three, Four of Diamonds were in the bottom two against Relley C. They sang "Who Are You" by Fifth Harmony and were saved by Walsh, Nicole Scherzinger and Simon Cowell. Voting statistics revealed that Relley C received more votes than Four of Diamonds in the main vote, meaning if Cowell sent the result to deadlock, Relley C would have been saved. The following week, they were in the bottom two against Gifty Louise; they sang "The Voice Within" by Christina Aguilera and were saved by Walsh, Scherzinger and Sharon Osbourne. Once again, Four of Diamonds came behind Louise in the main public vote meaning that if Osbourne sent the result to deadlock, Louise would have been saved. They were sent home on week 5, after a sing-off against Saara Aalto, when only Walsh voted to save them. In this sing-off, they sang "When You Believe" by Whitney Houston and Mariah Carey. However, voting statistics revealed that Four of Diamonds and Aalto received more votes than Sam Lavery in the public main vote; meaning if there was no lifeline vote, or if Aalto won the lifeline vote, Four of Diamonds would have competed against Lavery in the final showdown instead of Aalto. Additionally, in that scenario, if the result went to deadlock, Four of Diamonds would have been saved and Lavery would have been eliminated. Following the conclusion of the series, the final eight contestants co-headlined The X Factor Live Tour around in 2017. As part of this concert tour, Four of Diamonds performed to over 200,000 people across the United Kingdom.

2018–present: Upcoming debut album
On 14 June 2018, Four of Diamonds released their debut single, "Name On It", featuring Burna Boy. In September 2018, they were signed to EMI Records, becoming the first girl group to be signed to EMI since the Spice Girls. Following their signing, they released their second single, titled "Stupid Things", featuring Saweetie. On 30 November 2018, their third single, "Blind" was released. The song samples "Too Blind to See It" by Kym Sims, and was produced by Jonas Blue. Blue has also been confirmed as the executive producer of their debut album. Later that month, they held a three-date concert tour across England, visiting Birmingham, Manchester and London. On 17 May 2019, the group released their fourth single, "Walk Away", In an interview with Coup De Main, they revealed that both Rihanna and Zara Larsson recorded demos for "Walk Away", but the song was given to Four of Diamonds.  The single was supported by a concert held in London.

In May 2019, it was announced that Four of Diamonds were set to support Rita Ora on the Phoenix World Tour across the United Kingdom. After their performance at the O2 Arena, Philip Logan of CelebMix wrote that they "sparked an energy in the room", and that "commanding the audiences attention with immediate effect, the girls made the O2 stage their own – performing a strong set complete with slick choreography, tight vocal harmonies and killer tunes. With a confidence and chemistry that most girl bands can only dream of, there’s a genuine and undeniable sense of camaraderie between the ladies as they perform, so powerful that it translates from the stage right into the audience creating a visceral connection between them and their fans." On 30 May 2019, they performed "Walk Away" on Blue Peter, and the next day, they appeared as the musical guest on Britain's Got More Talent.

In July 2019, they performed at Bristol Pride, and later headlined their first show at Borderline, London. In August 2019, they performed as musical guests at CBBC's Summer Social event and Manchester Pride. On 19 September 2019, Four of Diamonds released their fifth single, "Eating Me Up", accompanied by a music video. Spindle described the song as "empowering, raw and relatable", and featured it on their playlist. On 31 October 2019, the group released a single titled "Long Way To Go", accompanied by a music video. Yasmin explains that the song has a double-meaning: it can be interpreted as describing being lied to in a relationship or about the importance of self-acceptance.

On 7 February 2020, the group released "Let Me Love You", which was followed by the release of "Superstar" in collaboration with Dutch producer Joe Stone on 27 March 2020. On 29 May 2020, Four of Diamonds released "The Writer" featuring Nigerian singer Mr Eazi, which Robin Murray of Clash described as "a neat pop burner with a taste of afrobeats". In November 2020, they released the song "Never Learn My Lesson" via Fascination after parting ways with EMI.

Members

Lauren Rammell
Lauren Rammell (born 18 June 1994) was born in Hersham, England. At the age of eleven, Rammell portrayed the role of Little Cosette in a West End production of Les Misérables. Before joining the group, Rammell attended the Italia Conti Academy, and worked as a dance teacher and at a supermarket. Her favorite artists include Beyoncé and Lewis Capaldi.

Caroline Alvares
Caroline Alvares (born 14 August 1996) was born in London, England. Before joining the group, she studied Music at the University of Westminster. Her favorite artists include Rosalía and J Balvin.

Sophia Saffarian
Sophia Saffarian (born 25 November 1996) was born in Birmingham, England. Growing up, she attended Hallfield School and King Edward VI High School for Girls, both independent schools in Edgbaston, and also sang in the Birmingham Gospel Choir. Before joining the group, Saffarian was studying Bioveterinary Science at Hartpury University, in the hope of becoming a vet. Her favorite artists include Tory Lanez.

Yasmin Broom
Yasmin Broom (born 25 November 1998) was born in Stretford, England. Growing up, she attended Flixton Girls' School and Access to Music College in Manchester. She also performed at the Urmston Live festival. She is also known as Yasmin Lauryn. Her favorite artists include Cardi B and Jorja Smith.

Discography

Extended plays

Singles

Music videos

Concert tours
Co-headlining
The X Factor Live Tour (2017)

Supporting
Phoenix World Tour (2019)

References

External links
 

21st-century English women singers
21st-century English singers
English pop girl groups
English girl groups
English pop music groups
English vocal groups
Musical groups established in 2016
Musical groups from London
Vocal quartets
The X Factor (British TV series) contestants
2016 establishments in England